The Professional Poker Tour (PPT) was a series of televised poker tournaments, spinning off from the World Poker Tour (WPT) television series.  It billed itself as the first professional poker league, and was limited to players who have established themselves on the World Poker Tour, World Series of Poker, or major participation on the poker circuit.

Matt Corboy was the lead commentator, with poker pro Mark Seif as color commentator and Kaye Han as floor reporter.  The first season, taped in 2004-2005, began airing regularly on Travel Channel on July 5, 2006 and left the air in 2007.

Television format
Events were telecast across five shows each.  The first four shows were labeled as quarters, from 1st Quarter to 4th Quarter, reflecting early-round play in the event.  The final six-player table was the fifth show of the cycle.

Qualifying
These tournaments were invitation-only freerolls (no entry fee, but only certain players were invited).

First season qualifiers
 All WPT winners
 Any player that made more than one WPT final table in a single season
 Top three places in WPT Championship
 Top ten places on WPT Season 2 Player of the Year list
 All previous winners of the World Series of Poker (WSOP) Main Event
 Top three places in 2003 and 2004 WSOP Main Event
 Top ten places on CardPlayer Player of the Year list
 Top ten places on Phil Hellmuth Jr Champion of the Year list
 Members of the World Poker Tour Walk of Fame
 Members of the Poker Hall of Fame
 Fourth, fifth and sixth place finish in WPT Championship
 Fourth, fifth and sixth place finish in WSOP Main Event during 2003 or 2004
 Players selected by the PPT Advisory Committee
 Top ten places on Poker Europa List for 2004
 WPT commentators

Second season
The PPT was canceled after one season.  Events that comprised the PPT in 2005 were integrated into the WPT schedule in 2007-08.

Results

Poker tournaments
Television shows about poker
Poker in North America